Flexiseps elongatus is a species of skink endemic to Madagascar.

References

Reptiles of Madagascar
Reptiles described in 1933
Flexiseps
Taxa named by Fernand Angel